P. montana may refer to:

Passiflora montana, plant in the family Passifloraceae
Platyptilia montana, moth of the family Pterophoridae
Pradosia montana, plant in the family Sapotaceae
Prestoea montana, the Sierran palm
Prumnopitys montana, conifer of the family Podocarpaceae
Psydrax montana, plant of the family Rubiaceae
Pueraria montana, plant of the bean family